The Atitara is a river and valley of western Tahiti, French Polynesia. It flows into the sea at Pa'ea.

References

External links
Atitara at GeoNames

Rivers of Tahiti